The 2022–23 Central Michigan Chippewas men's basketball team represented Central Michigan University in the 2022–23 NCAA Division I men's basketball season. The Chippewas, led by second year head coach Tony Barbee, played their home games at McGuirk Arena in Mount Pleasant, Michigan as members of the Mid-American Conference.They finished 10–21 with a 5–13 MAC record.  They finished tied for ninth in the MAC and failed to qualify for the MAC tournament.

Previous season

The Chippewas finished the finished the season 7–23, 6–12 in MAC play to finish in 8th place. They lost to Toledo in the first round of the MAC tournament.

Offseason

Departures

Incoming transfers

Recruiting class

Roster

Schedule and results 

|-
!colspan=9 style=|Exhibition

|-
!colspan=9 style=|Non-conference regular season

|-
!colspan=9 style=| MAC regular season

Source

References

Central Michigan Chippewas men's basketball seasons
Central Michigan Chippewas
Central Michigan Chippewas men's basketball
Central Michigan Chippewas men's basketball